This list of Caucasian animals extinct in the Holocene features animals known to have become extinct in the last 12,000 years in the Caucasian region between Europe and Asia.

Many extinction dates are unknown due to a lack of relevant information.

Mammals

Undated

Prehistoric

Recent

Local

Birds

Fish

References 

Extinct animals of Europe
Lists of extinct animals by region